Naval Headquarters (NHQ) is the headquarters of Pakistan Navy established in 1947 in Karachi. On 15 March 1975, it was moved to Islamabad. Initially it was housed in a government secretariat building of sector G-6 in Islamabad and was later shifted to sector E-8.See also
 Joint Staff Headquarters (Pakistan)
 Air Headquarters (Pakistan Air Force)
 General Headquarters (Pakistan Army)

References 

Pakistan Navy
Islamabad
Military headquarters in Pakistan
Pakistan